Mikkelborg is a seaside locality in Hørsholm Municipality, located between Rungsted to the south and Kokkedal to the north, some 20 km north of Copenhagen, Denmark. Mikkelborg Strandpark (Mikkelborg Beach Park) is a public park and beach. Mikkelgård, a listed house from  1916 located inside the park, is now operated as a restaurant.

History

The area was built over with large houses in the beginning of the 20th century. Villa Mikkeborg was built in 1900 by a son of Frederik Horsens Block from Kokkedal House. Another house was built by Carlsberg-heir Vagn Jacobsen in 1926.

Later the Danish statate began to acquire some of the large houses in the Mikkelborg area with the intention of a beach park similar to the one at Bellevue Beach further to the south. The 8-hectares park was protected in 1999. Other houses were purchased by Hørsholm Municipality. They were demolished in the early 1980s to make way for the housing estate Mikkelborg Park. The 8-hectares beach park was protected in 1999.

Mikkelgård

Mikkelgård is the former summer retreat of the composer Hakon Schmedes who named his house after the locality. It was built in 1915–16 to design by Povl Baumann who was influenced by the Arts & Crafts movement. It is a four-winged house built with exposed timber framing facing the central courtyard. The house is surrounded by moats and is connected to the "main land" by a bridge. It was converted into a restaurant in 1990. The former stables wasrenovated in 1997 and has room for 120 dining guests.

References

External links
 Images of Mikkelgaard at arkitekturbilleder.dk

Hørsholm Municipality
Houses in Hørsholm Municipality
Listed buildings and structures in Hørsholm Municipality